The Year of the Six Emperors was the year AD 238, during which six men made claims to be emperors of Rome. This was an early symptom of what historians now call the Crisis of the Third Century, also known as Military Anarchy or the Imperial Crisis (AD 235–284), a period in which the Roman Empire nearly collapsed under the combined pressures of foreign invasions and migrations into the Roman territory, civil wars, peasant rebellions, political instability (with multiple usurpers competing for power), Roman reliance on (and growing influence of) foreign mercenaries known as foederati and commanders nominally working for Rome (but increasingly independent), the devastating social and economic effects of the plague, debasement of currency, and economic depression. The crisis ended with the ascension of Diocletian and his implementation of reforms in 284.

History

Maximinus Thrax
The emperor at the beginning of the year was Maximinus Thrax, who had ruled since 235. Later sources claim he was a cruel tyrant, and in January of 238, a revolt erupted in North Africa. The Historia Augusta states:
"The Romans could bear his barbarities no longer—the way in which he called up informers and incited accusers, invented false offences, killed innocent men, condemned all whoever came to trial, reduced the richest men to utter poverty and never sought money anywhere save in some other's ruin, put many generals and many men of consular rank to death for no offence, carried others about in wagons without food and drink, and kept others in confinement, in short neglected nothing which he thought might prove effectual for cruelty—and, unable to suffer these things longer, they rose against him in revolt."

Gordian I and Gordian II
Some young aristocrats in Africa murdered the imperial tax-collector then approached the regional governor, Gordian, and insisted that he proclaim himself emperor. Gordian agreed reluctantly, but as he was almost 80 years old, he decided to make his son joint emperor, with equal power. The senate recognised father and son as emperors Gordian I and Gordian II, respectively.

Their reign, however, lasted for only 20 days. Capelianus, the governor of the neighbouring province of Numidia, held a grudge against the Gordians. He led an army to fight them and defeated them decisively at Carthage. Gordian II was killed in the battle, and on hearing this news, Gordian I hanged himself.

Gordian I and II were deified by the senate.

Pupienus, Balbinus and Gordian III
Meanwhile, Maximinus, now declared a public enemy, had already begun to march on Rome with another army. The senate's previous candidates, the Gordians, had failed to defeat him, and knowing that they stood to die if he succeeded, the senate needed a new emperor to defeat him.  With no other candidates in view, on 22 April 238 they elected two elderly senators, Pupienus and Balbinus (who had both been part of a special senatorial commission to deal with Maximinus), as joint emperors.

This choice was not popular with the people, however, and mobs threw stones and sticks at the new emperors. Therefore, Marcus Antonius Gordianus Pius, the thirteen-year-old grandson of Gordian I, was nominated as emperor Gordian III, holding power only nominally in order to appease the population of the capital, which was still loyal to the Gordian family.

Pupienus was sent at the head of an army to face Maximinus, and Balbinus stayed in Rome. Meanwhile, Maximinus was also having problems. In early February, he reached the city of Aquileia, to find that it had declared for his three enemies. Maximinus besieged the city, but without success. By April, discontent due to this failure, the lack of success in the campaign in general, lack of supplies and the strong opposition from the senate, forced his legionaries to rethink their allegiance.

Soldiers of the II Parthica killed Maximinus in his tent, along with his son Maximus (who had been appointed deputy emperor in 236), and surrendered to Pupienus at the end of June. Maximinus' and his son's corpses were decapitated and their heads carried to Rome. For saving Rome from a public enemy, the soldiers were pardoned and sent back to their provinces.

The co-emperor then returned to Rome, only to find the city in riot. Balbinus had not managed to control the situation, and the city had burned in a fire, resulting in mutiny. With both emperors present, the situation calmed down, but the unease remained.

Coins from their reign show one of them on one side and two clasped hands on the other to show their joint power, yet their relationship was clouded with suspicion from the start, with each fearing assassination by the other. They were planning an enormous double campaign, Pupienus against the Parthians and Balbinus against the Carpians (Grant says against the Goths and the Persians, respectively), but they quarrelled frequently and could not agree or trust each other.

It was during one of these heated discussions, in May or on July 29, that the Praetorian Guard decided to intervene. They stormed into the room containing the emperors, seized them both, stripped them, dragged them naked through the streets, tortured and eventually murdered them. On the same day, Gordian III was proclaimed sole emperor (238–244), though in reality his advisors exercised most of his power. Together Pupienus and Balbinus had ruled for only 99 days.

See also
Year of the Four Emperors (AD 69)
Year of the Five Emperors (AD 193)

References

Ancient sources
Historia Augusta
Herodian

Modern sources 
 Henning Börm: Die Herrschaft des Kaisers Maximinus Thrax und das Sechskaiserjahr 238. Der Beginn der "Reichskrise"?, in: Gymnasium 115, 2008, pp. 69–86.
 David Potter: The Roman Empire at Bay. London 2004, pp. 167–172.

Civil wars of the Roman Empire
238
230s in the Roman Empire
Crisis of the Third Century
Roman emperors
Wars of succession involving the states and peoples of Europe
Wars of succession involving the states and peoples of Africa